The 2015–16 Nemzeti Bajnokság I is the 71st season of the Nemzeti Bajnokság I, Hungary's premier Volleyball league.

Team information 

The following 12 clubs compete in the NB I during the 2015–16 season:

Playoffs 
Teams in bold won the playoff series. Numbers to the left of each team indicate the team's original playoff seeding. Numbers to the right indicate the score of each playoff game.

Final
(to 3 victories)

|}

Hungarian clubs in European competitions
Women's CEV Cup
Linamar-Békéscsabai RSE

CEV Women's Challenge Cup

Vasas Óbuda

TEVA Gödöllő

Fatum-Nyíregyháza

External links
 Hungarian Volleyball Federaration 

Nemzeti Bajnoksag
Nemzeti Bajnoksag
Nemzeti Bajnoksag seasons